Perseo Miranda and his Theatre is the first album released by Italian singer and songwriter, Perseo Miranda. The album contains 7 tracks, and was released in 1980 under the label Lodger Records. Six tracks are in Italian; just one track is in English.

Track listing
Obitorio
Let's beat the power
Lamenti al nulla
Sotto il filo spinato
Segmento a 		
E' fuggito sulle feci
Il cerchio

References

External links
 Perseo Miranda official website
 Perseo Miranda official Myspace site

1981 debut albums
Perseo Miranda albums